Hypoliet Geraard van den Bosch (30 April 1926 – 1 December 2011), nicknamed Poly, was a Belgian football player who finished top scorer of the Belgian League in 1954 while playing for R.S.C. Anderlecht.  He played 8 times with the Belgium national team between 1953 and 1957. "Poly" made his international debut on 22 November 1953 in a 2–2 friendly draw against Switzerland and he scored twice. Van den Bosch was in the team for the 1954 FIFA World Cup.

References

External links
 
 

1926 births
2011 deaths
Footballers from Brussels
1954 FIFA World Cup players
Belgian Pro League players
Belgian footballers
Belgium international footballers
R.S.C. Anderlecht players
S.C. Eendracht Aalst players
R.S.C. Anderlecht managers
Expatriate football managers in Venezuela
Venezuela national football team managers
Association football forwards
Belgian football managers